The 544th Bombardment Squadron is an inactive United States Air Force unit.  It was last assigned to the 384th Bombardment Wing at Little Rock Air Force Base, Arkansas, where it was inactivated on 1 September 1964.

The squadron was first activated during World War II as a heavy bomber unit.  After training in the United States, it moved to England, where it participated in the strategic bombing campaign against Germany.  It earned two Distinguished Unit Citations during combat over Europe.  It remained in Europe after V-E Day, and was inactivated in France in 1946.  The squadron was again active in the reserve from 1947 to 1949, but does not appear to have been fully manned or equipped.

The squadron was activated by Strategic Air Command at Little Rock in 1955, and served as part of SAC's strategic deterrent force until inactivating as SAC phased out the Boeing B-47 Stratojet.

History

World War II

Activation and training
The squadron was first organized at Gowen Field, Idaho on 1 December 1942 as one of the original four squadrons of the 384th Bombardment Group. It moved the next month to Wendover Field, Utah, where it began training with the Boeing B-17 Flying Fortress. It completed training in May 1943, and began its move to the European Theater of Operations. The air echelon staged through Kearney Army Air Field, Nebraska, starting on 3 May and ferried their B-17s via the northern ferry route. The first planes arrived at RAF Grafton Underwood on 25 May 1943.

Combat in Europe

The squadron arrived at its combat station, RAF Grafton Underwood on 6 June 1943.  It flew its first mission on 23 June, a diversionary strike against the Ford and General Motors plants at Antwerp.  The squadron primarily flew missions in the strategic bombing campaign against Germany, striking air bases and industrial targets in France and Germany.  Targets included Orleans/Bricy and Nancy/Azelot Airfields, an engine manufacturing factory at Cologne, a coke distillation facility at Gelsenkirchen, an aircraft component plant at Halberstadt, a steel manufacturing plant at Magdeburg and the ball bearing factory at Schweinfurt.

The squadron participated in a raid on aircraft factories in Germany on 11 January 1944 for which it was awarded a Distinguished Unit Citation (DUC).  This was a prelude to Big Week, a concentrated series of raids by Eighth Air Force, aimed at destroying Germany's aircraft manufacturing industry in late February.  On 24 April 1944, the 384th Group, although crippled by heavy losses, led the 41st Bombardment Wing, in an attack on the Dornier Flugzeugwerke aircraft manufacturing plant at Oberpfaffenhofen, pressing the attack through almost overwhelming opposition.  One group commander described the opposition on this mission as the heaviest he had seen during the war.  This mission resulted in the award of a second DUC to the squadron.  Other strategic targets included communications centers, oil refineries and storage facilities at Leipzig and Berlin, marshalling yards at Duren and Mannheim, and port facilities.

The squadron was occasionally diverted from the strategic bombing campaign to fly air support and interdiction missions.  It attacked targets along the coast of Normandy to support Operation Overlord, continuing these attacks through D-Day, when it attacked airfields and communications facilities beyond the beachhead.  On 24 and 25 July 1944, it supported Operation Cobra, the breakout at Saint Lo with attacks on enemy strong points just beyond enemy lines.  It hit armor and artillery concentrations near Eindhoven to support Operation Market Garden, the attempt to seize a bridgehead across the Rhine in the Netherlands during September 1944.  It attacked enemy fortifications and communications during the Battle of the Bulge from December 1944 through January 1945.  When the Allies attacked across the Rhine in Germany in March 1945, it attacked rail facilities, including marshalling yards and bridges to cut enemy supply lines.

The squadron flew its last combat mission on 25 April 1945.  After V-E Day the squadron remained in Europe as part of United States Air Forces in Europe.  It assisted Air Transport Command in the Green Project by flying soldiers to Casablanca, French Morocco for transport back to the United States.  From its continental base at Istres Air Base, France, it flew Greek military back to their homeland, and transported displaced persons.  The squadron transported American troops to Germany to serve in the military occupation forces there, but was gradually drawn down.  It was inactivated in France in February 1946 and its remaining personnel and equipment were absorbed by the 306th Bombardment Group.

Air Force reserve
The squadron was activated in the reserve at Nashville Municipal Airport, Tennessee in July 1947.  The unit's training was initially supervised by Air Defense Command.  In 1948  Continental Air Command assumed responsibility for managing reserve and Air National Guard units from ADC.   Although it does not appear that the unit was fully manned or equipped at this time, President Truman’s reduced 1949 defense budget also required reductions in the number of units in the Air Force, and the 544th was inactivated, as reserve flying operations at Nashville ceased

Strategic bomber operations
The squadron was activated at Little Rock Air Force Base, Arkansas in August 1955.  However, it was minimally manned and did not begin to receive its Boeing B-47 Stratojets until the following year.  The squadron began to train in its intercontinental bombing mission in February 1956.  As part of Operation Reflex, the squadron deployed to RAF Brize Norton from 3 January to 5 April 1957.  Reflex placed Stratojets and Boeing KC-97s at bases closer to the Soviet Union for 90 day periods, although individuals rotated back to home bases during unit Reflex deployments 

From 1958, the Stratojet wings of Strategic Air Command (SAC) began to assume an alert posture at their home bases, reducing the amount of time spent on alert at overseas bases.  General Thomas S. Power’s initial goal was to maintain one third of SAC’s planes on fifteen minute ground alert, fully fueled and ready for combat to reduce vulnerability to a Soviet missile strike.  The alert commitment was increased to half the squadron's aircraft in 1962.

During the 1962 Cuban Missile Crisis, The squadron's B-47s dispersed on 22 October.  Most dispersal bases were civilian airfields with  reserve or Air National Guard units.  The B-47s were configured for execution of the Emergency War Order as soon as possible after dispersal. On 24 October SAC went to DEFCON 2, placing all the squadron's aircraft on alert.  As tensions began to ease, on 15 November 1/6 of the dispersed B-47s were recalled to their home bases.  On 21 November SAC relaxed its readiness status to DEFCON 3.  The squadron's remaining dispersed B-47s were recalled to home base on 24 November. On 27 November SAC returned to normal alert posture.

However, SAC was phasing the B-47 out of its nuclear delivery forces and the squadron was inactivated along with its parent wing on 1 September 1964.

Lineage
 Constituted as the 544th Bombardment Squadron (Heavy) on 25 November 1942
 Activated on 1 December 1942
 Redesignated 544th Bombardment Squadron, Heavy on 20 August 1943
 Inactivated on 28 February 1946
 Redesignated 544th Bombardment Squadron, Very Heavy on 9 July 1947
 Activated in the reserve on 16 July 1947
 Inactivated on 27 June 1949
 Redesignated 544th Bombardment Squadron, Medium on 3 June 1955
 Activated on 1 August 1955
 Discontinued and inactivated on 1 September 1964

Assignments
 384th Bombardment Group, 1 December 1942 – 28 February 1946
 384th Bombardment Group, 16 July 1947 – 27 June 1949
 384th Bombardment Wing, 1 August 1955 – 1 September 1964

Stations
 Gowen Field, Idaho, 1 December 1942
 Wendover Field, Utah, 2 January 1943
 Sioux City Army Air Base, Iowa, 3 April–10 May 1943
 RAF Grafton Underwood (Station 106), England, 4 June 1943
 Istres Air Base (Station 196) (Y-17), France, 22 June 1945 – 28 February 1946
 Nashville Municipal Airport, Tennessee, 16 July 1947 – 27 June 1949
 Little Rock Air Force Base, Arkansas, 1 August 1955 – 1 September 1964

Aircraft
 Boeing B-17 Flying Fortress, 1942–1946
 Boeing B-47 Stratojet, 1956–1964

Awards and campaigns

See also

 B-17 Flying Fortress units of the United States Army Air Forces
 List of B-47 units of the United States Air Force

References

Notes

Bibliography

 
 
 
 
 
 
 
 
 
 
 
 

Bombardment squadrons of the United States Air Force
Strategic bombing squadrons of the United States Army Air Forces
Military units and formations established in 1942
Units and formations of Strategic Air Command
Military units and formations of the United States Air Force Reserves
Military units and formations of the United States in the Cold War